The Fund for American Studies is a conservative non-profit organization based in Washington, D.C. Founded in 1967, the organization's mission is "to win over each new generation to the ideas of liberty, limited government and free markets."

History

In 1967, Charles Edison took the first steps toward establishing the institution that is known today as The Fund for American Studies. Edison was a former governor of New Jersey, Secretary of the Navy, and son of inventor Thomas Alva Edison.

Concerned about an eroding confidence in the American system of government, Edison recruited Walter H. Judd, David R. Jones, Marvin Liebman, and William F. Buckley Jr. to build a program that would educate college students about American government, politics, and economics.

On February 6, 1967, the group incorporated the Charles Edison Youth Fund. In 1969, Edison died suddenly. To honor him and carry on his mission, the organization was renamed the Charles Edison Memorial Youth Fund. In 1985, the organization was renamed again to its present-day title, The Fund for American Studies. In the summer of 1970, the Edison Fund organized the inaugural Institute on Comparative Political and Economic Systems. Fifty-seven students attended the first Institute.

References

External links
 
 Organizational Profile – National Center for Charitable Statistics (Urban Institute)

Business education
Legal education
Organizations established in 1967
Educational organizations based in the United States
American journalism organizations
1967 establishments in the United States